Kenneth Ray Westerfield is a pioneering Frisbee disc player.

He is a Hall of Fame inductee in freestyle, ultimate and disc golf, and was also voted top men's player in the 1970-75 Decade Awards. Westerfield produced numerous tournaments, world records, many competitive wins in freestyle, ultimate, disc golf, distance and other individual events in over-all tournaments in the 1970s. He invented freestyle moves, including "body-rolls" and presented early disc sports, including freestyle, disc golf and ultimate competitions at the Canadian Open Frisbee Championships (1972-1985), Toronto, Ontario and the Vancouver Open Frisbee Championships (1974-1977), Vancouver, BC. In 1979, Westerfield started the first ultimate league in Canada, the Toronto Ultimate Club (TUC). He also co-produced the Santa Cruz Flying Disc Classic, Santa Cruz, California (1978), the Labatt's World Guts Championships, Toronto, (1985) and the World PDGA Disc Golf Championships, Toronto, (1987).  Westerfield was one of the original freestylers from the 1960s and used his expertise in several company sponsored touring promotional Frisbee shows in the U.S. and Canada for Irwin Toy, (Frisbee distributor in Canada, 1972–76), Molson Frisbee Team (1974–77), Adidas Canada (1974-1979), Goodtimes Professional Frisbee Show (1978–82), Orange Crush Frisbee Team (1977–78), Air Canada Frisbee Team (1978–79), Lee Jeans Frisbee Team (1979–80) and the Labatts Schooner Frisbee Team (1983–85).

Early life

Kenneth Ray Westerfield was born in Detroit, Michigan, to Margaret Marion (née Beach) a clerical administrator for the public school system and his father Gene C. Westerfield, a trade school trained refrigeration contractor in a family owned business of refrigeration and air conditioning. In the late fifties, the family moved from Detroit to Livonia, Michigan, now twelve years old, he lived with his parents and younger sister Kathy, who graduated from Winston Churchill High School in 1972 and has made a career in special education. Born into a close, middle class, conservative household,  Westerfield attended area public schools and was active in many sports. His father, whose father Cleo Conn Westerfield played baseball for the Detroit Street Railway League in the 1920s, was very active in sports himself. This contributed to Westerfield's early sporting interest. Sports in the order of interest, along with all disc sports, were baseball, hockey, motorcycles, golf and basketball in which he competed in several city leagues.

Early Frisbee and pre-disc sports career

It was at age thirteen, in 1960, that Westerfield became best friends with Hall of Fame and Discraft founder Jim Kenner. They began playing Frisbee in high school. Daily they would experiment with new ways of throwing and catching the Frisbee, this would later be called "playing freestyle." In the sixties, when the Frisbee was still considered a toy used just for recreation, there wasn't a reason to become proficient at throwing a Frisbee, no Frisbee professionals to emulate or disc sports tournaments to compete in. The only reason they became as good as they were was because of their shared anti-establishment attitude and lifestyle (that also included the rejection of traditional sports in general). This would result in a proficiency at playing Frisbee that had never been seen before. They would later invent disc sport competitive formats during the early years of Frisbee competitions.

Graduating in 1965 from Franklin High School (Livonia, Michigan), and living the counterculture lifestyle, Westerfield and Kenner spent their summer days on Cass and Silver Lake beaches, as well as at music and rock festivals, displaying their freestyling Frisbee skills. One day, noticing an event ad in a local alternative newspaper, they took their Frisbees and a VW Bug and went to a music festival near Bethel, NY, called Woodstock, that later became the music event of the century. While at the festival they would throw the Frisbee over and just out of reach of the crowd, who while sitting on the ground watching the bands would keep reaching for it as it flew by, probably not even knowing what it was. Westerfield later stated, "it was an interesting crowd to play for".

In 1970, Westerfield and Kenner moved to Toronto, Ontario, Canada, setting up their disc playing headquarters in Queen's Park. Playing Frisbee freestyle and object disc golf became a daily event at the park. In 1971, with a hundred dollars each, bedrolls and a Frisbee, they set out to hitchhike across Canada, stopping to do Frisbee street performances to crowds in cities and at popular annual events, the Klondike Days in Edmonton and the Calgary Stampede in Alberta. Concluding their cross country hitchhiking tour in Vancouver, British Columbia, they made their summer home in the Yippie (Youth International Party) founded "All Seasons Park" (tent city). A protest against the Four Seasons company plans to build a complex on two blocks adjacent to Stanley Park, inspired and modeled after People's Park (Berkeley), that was formed two years prior. Westerfield and Kenner, although not politically affiliated with the Yippies, still made the protested park their home. They would make a minimal income, by selling alternative newspapers, the Georgia Straight, on the city streets by day and performing nightly Frisbee shows in the historic Gastown area, in front of a railroad car turn restaurant, oddly enough called Frisby's. Because of the urban settings, free-styling with a Frisbee at night in front of crowds in the streets was very surreal. They would bounce the disc off the buildings, throw around statues, skip the Frisbee through traffic and throw over mobs of interested spectators. One night, while performing at Frisby's, they unwittingly became involved in the Yippie organized Gastown Smoke-in, a demonstration for the legalization of marijuana. The subsequent smoking of it in the town square, quickly turned the peaceful but illegal demonstration into the now famous Gastown Riots, the police also began regular raids of All Seasons Park.

In the fall of 1971, Westerfield and Kenner wanted to return to Toronto but needed travel money. Continuing to perform at Frisby's, they decided they would try to collect money like street musicians, it was a success. Returning to Toronto, they lived in the notorious counter-cultural Rochdale College while performing Frisbee shows on the Yonge Street Mall. Nightly, thousands of tourists and Torontonians would enjoy displays of their Frisbee expertise, while attractive accomplices (girlfriends) would use a Frisbee to collect donations. Wanting to add professional legitimacy to their Frisbee show, they approached Ed Hurst, promotions manager for Irwin Toy, the distributor of Frisbees in Canada and proposed their show to promote the Frisbee. Their first professional performance was a basketball half-time show at Jarvis Collegiate Institute in Toronto, Ontario. The students loved it; Westerfield and Kenner were only paid twenty dollars each for the show, but more importantly, they had proven that their show would be beneficial in helping the company to promote the Frisbee. In 1972, they were retained by Irwin Toy to perform at special community and sporting events across Canada. Westerfield and Kenner became the world's first full-time professional touring Frisbee players.

The Canadian Open Frisbee Championships and the beginning of flying disc sports

There were a few guts and distance competitions in the 1960s but disc sports really began in the early 1970s. The IFT guts  Frisbee competitions in Northern Michigan, the Canadian Open Frisbee Championships, Toronto, ON (1972), the Vancouver Open Frisbee Championships, Vancouver, BC (1974), the Octad, New Brunswick, NJ (1974), the American Flying Disc Open (AFDO), Rochester, NY (1974) and the WFC, Rose Bowl, Pasadena, CA (1974), were the earliest Frisbee competitions to introduce the Frisbee as a new disc sport, up until these tournaments, the Frisbee was used as recreation and generally considered to be a toy. Westerfield and Kenner teamed up with Humber College professor Andrew Davidson, early Canadian disc sport promoter and Jeff Otis, event coordinator for the Canadian National Exhibition (CNE), to produce the Canadian Open Frisbee Championships (1972-1985). This international competition began with disc guts and distance, then added disc golf, freestyle, ultimate and individual field events at the Canadian National Exhibition (CNE), then in 1975, the tournament was moved to Toronto Islands. Westerfield and Kenner also created the Vancouver Open Frisbee Championships (1974-1977).
Before playing Frisbee was considered a sport, Ken Westerfield and Jim Kenner were, by comparison to other professional sports, the athletic equivalent of what would be considered a professional Frisbee athlete. Some of today's techniques as well as competitive formats came from these pioneers. The Canadian Open Frisbee Championships and the Vancouver Open Frisbee Championships introduced Frisbee as a disc sport, including the first competitive freestyle events.

Freestyle is an event where teams of two or three players perform a routine that consists of a series of creative throwing and catching techniques set to music. The routine is judged on the basis of difficulty, execution and presentation. The team with the best total score is declared the winner. Freestyle play prior to 1975, before the invention of the nail-delay, was a fast moving and flowing routine of many throwing variations with spinning and leaping stylized catches off the throw. Early freestyle play was intense and commonly compared to martial arts and dance. In 1973, Westerfield and Kenner, wanting to see if there were other players that could freestyle with a Frisbee decided to add their idea of a Frisbee freestyle competition to the 2nd Canadian Open Frisbee Championships, but due to a lack of competitors, the freestyle event was canceled. Unknown to them at the time, there was the beginning of a growing Frisbee freestyle swell in the United States, Berkeley, New York, Ann Arbor, New Jersey and Chicago. Next year newly energized freestylers assembled in Toronto, to compete in this new freestyle event. In 1974, at the 3rd annual Canadian Open Frisbee Championships, Westerfield and Kenner would introduce this event called freestyle and they won it.

The Decade Awards 1970-75 Top Freestyle Routine: Ken Westerfield/Jim Kenner Canadian Open 1974:

Considered the greatest speedflow game of all time. Ken and Jim put on a clinic to cap off a blistering hot final by all of the teams. They featured a rhythmic and dynamic style with concise catch and throw combinations. These two gentlemen are credited with creating formal disc freestyle competition. The 1973 Canadian Open did not have freestyle as an event, the end result made history.

Among the competing freestyle pairing were such Frisbee notable's as Doug Corea/Jim Palmeri, John Kirkland/Jose Montalvo, Irv Kalb/Dave "Buddha" Meyers, Dan "Stork" Roddick /Bruce Koger, Tom Cleworth/John Connelly. This was the first freestyle competition. Westerfield and Kenner having won, as the world's first Freestyle Frisbee Champions, that same year hosted the second freestyle competition, along with other Frisbee events, at their Vancouver Open Frisbee Championships, Kitsilano Beach, Vancouver, British Columbia. This is where Bill King, Jim Brown and John Anthony of early freestyle fame, made their first competitive appearance. A year later, the American Flying Disc Open (AFDO) in Rochester, New York, the Octad, in New Brunswick, New Jersey and the 1975 World Frisbee Championships, held at the Rose Bowl in Pasadena, California, adopted Westerfield and Kenner's freestyle competition format as one of their new events. Today that same freestyle event is one of the premier events in flying disc tournaments worldwide. 
Jim Kenner and Ken Westerfield were inducted into the Inaugural Pioneer Class of the FPA Freestyle Disc Hall of Fame:

Their play, innovation and influence began in the formative years prior to competition, and was critical to the origin of the competitive sport of Freestyle

In 1974, Westerfield and Kenner approached Molson Breweries with the idea of performing Frisbee shows at basketball halftimes in Canadian universities as the Molson Frisbee Team. Always looking for unique ways to get into the university market, they accepted their proposal and were more than impressed with the results. The next year, Molson's up the promotional fee and used their show exclusively to introduce a new brand of beer called Molson Diamond.

In 1975, with Molson's sponsorship, Westerfield and Kenner moved the Canadian Open Frisbee Championships, from the Canadian National Exhibition to Toronto Islands. Molson's would continue to sponsor their Frisbee shows and events for several years. Along with promoting Molson products, this would help Westerfield and Kenner to promote their new sport everywhere.

Competitive years in disc sports, 1974-79

Frisbee (disc) tournaments were beginning to attract excellent disc competitors from everywhere. What was once a top selling toy from Wham-O, was becoming a serious competitive sport. Being 27 years old in 1974 (the first year of disc freestyle and over-all competitions) Westerfield's competitive participation only spanned five years, but in that short time had wins in every disc sport. What attracted Westerfield to playing with a Frisbee and developing his freestyle play in the sixties, is that he found that it didn't have to be competitive to be athletically challenging. Westerfield co-created and won the first freestyle competition and between 1976 and 1978 competing in North American Series (NAS) competitions to qualify for competing in the annual World Frisbee Championships (WFC), won six U.S. national freestyle titles including both 1976 Eastern and Western national freestyle titles and appeared in fifteen additional freestyle finals. When other sports like disc golf, ultimate, double disc court and over-all events were introduced to the Frisbee scene in the early 1970s, Westerfield quickly excelled in these new events because many of the skills involved in these new disc sports were skills that would transfer from his freestyle play. Westerfield having a dual Canadian/U.S. legal living status, considering Toronto to be his home, always competed for Canada at U.S. and World competitions.

In 1975, at the Canadian Open Frisbee Championships in Toronto, Westerfield set the MTA (maximum time aloft) world record with a sidearm throw of 15 seconds, using a Super Pro Model Frisbee, beating the old record of 11 seconds. Also in 1975, Westerfield invented a new freestyle move called "body-roll," (rolling the disc across outstretched arms and chest, or back), then presented the move in a freestyle event at a national tournament in Rochester, NY called the AFDO, (American Flying Disc Open). The hottest move of the day was called the, "Canadian mind blower". Westerfield would roll the Frisbee across outstretched arms and chest, to outstretched arms across the back (front to back-roll). Today body-rolls (rolls) are an integral part of every freestyle routine.
In 1974, Wham-O sponsored the first World Frisbee Championships (WFC) that included the North American Series (NAS) Frisbee tournaments held across the U.S. and Canada. These competitions were held for the purpose of qualifying competitors to compete annually in the WFC at the Rose Bowl in Pasadena, California. Winning numerous North American Series (NAS) freestyle and individual events, Westerfield was chosen as the "Best Player of the Decade" in the 1970s,
 
The Decade Awards: Best Men's Player 1970-1975:

Ken Westerfield Big, Strong and Athletically gifted. Known for his overall skills as well. His forehand power throw, in particular, is probably still unmatched for sheer power. His freestyle skills did not take a back seat. He was adept at intricate moves, especially in the speed flow game. He was also an innovator. It is believed that he was the first person to do a body roll. The hottest move of the day was called the "Canadian Mind blower" which was a front roll to a foot tip to a backroll.

At a North American Series (NAS) Frisbee tournament in Dallas Texas, Westerfield became a member of the "400 club" with a prelim distance sidearm throw (also known as forehand), and won the event with a throw of 378 feet, using a 119-gram World Class Model Frisbee. Only two competitors have officially ever thrown over 400 feet in competition with a 119-gram Frisbee (Lightweight disc by today's standard).

In 1978, Boulder, Colorado, while doing a distance throwing demonstration at a North American Series (NAS) event, Westerfield threw a 119-gram World Class Model Frisbee, 552 feet, using his characteristic sidearm throw, beating the official world distance record of 412 feet.

This is how Kevin (Skippy) Givens, World Freestyle Champion, remembers it:

Someone paced off the distance to a building at around 500 feet. Dave Johnson,(former distance world record holder) and others we're trying to hit it. Finally, Dave hits the building and the crowd goes wild. Ken Westerfield was sitting and watching. After Dave hit the building the crowd started to yell for Ken to throw. At first Ken was dismissive, not interested. Finally Ken stood up, went to the line, sized up the task then let it fly. It landed in the parking lot past the building on his first throw with no warm up. The crowd went crazy. It was the most incredible throw I'd ever seen.

Tournament officials marked and measured the throw at 552 feet and until 2014, was the longest distance toss for a sidearm (forehand) throw. Since new manufacturers have introduced heavyweight, beveled edge golf disc and new record attempts are in the high desert winds of Primm, NV, the world distance record is now just over 600 feet for the forehand (sidearm) throw. Westerfield's 552 foot throw is still the longest measured distance toss for a Wham-O brand Frisbee disc.

In 1977, Kenner moved to London, Ontario, and created a disc manufacturing and distributing company called Discraft. Westerfield went to Santa Cruz, California, teaming up with Tom Schot, to help produce Frisbee events in Northern California, including the Santa Cruz
Westerfield also created a Frisbee Show called Good Times Professional Frisbee Show that featured freestyle champion Mary Kathron, and later World Freestyle Champion Brian McElwain. Westerfield and his touring team performed shows at universities, fairs, music festivals and professional sporting events throughout the US and Canada for some of America's largest companies, Labatt Brewing Company, Air Canada, Lee Jeans, Orange Crush and Adidas.

Disc golf

As of 2017, there are over 7000 disc golf courses. Before 1975 and the invention of the disc golf target called the Disc Pole Hole, there were only a few mapped disc golf "object" courses in the U.S. and Canada. In 1970, you could count the number of  designed courses, using the Frisbee to play golf and designated objects as holes, on one hand, Rochester, NY, Berkeley, CA and Toronto, ON, were disc golf's first designed courses, all completely unaware of the others existence.

In Canada, beginning in 1970, before even the idea of disc sports and the DGA, Ken Westerfield and Jim Kenner, played Frisbee golf daily on an 18 object hole course they designed at Queen's Park in downtown Toronto. They also added disc golf to their other tournament events at the Canadian Open Frisbee Championships on Toronto Islands and the Vancouver Open Frisbee Championships, Vancouver, BC. These were the first disc golf tournaments in Canada, beginning with using objects as holes and then permanently placed disc pole holes. In 1987, Ken Westerfield as Tournament Director produced the PDGA World Championships on Toronto Islands. This was the only time this annual championship has been held outside of the United States. 
Ken Westerfield was inducted into the PDGA Disc Golf Hall of Fame with the following:

Ken Westerfield is an icon of disc golf and one of the strongest overall competitors in flying disc sports of all time. His powerful and accurate sidearm throw is widely acknowledged as one of the best the sport has ever seen. He was one of the top players at the emergence of organized disc golf competition. He pioneered the growth of disc golf across Canada. Many Canadian players trace their introduction to disc golf to being mentored by Ken. His contributions are a huge part of the foundation of our sport.

Ultimate Frisbee in Canada

Ultimate is a team sport played with a flying disc on a rectangular field, 120 yards (110m) by 40 yards (37m). The object of the game is to score points by passing the disc to members of your own team until you have successfully completed a pass to a team member in the opposing team's end zone. Ultimate comes with a self-regulated rule of playing conduct called the  Spirit of the Game. " A players personal conduct as a competitor is as important as winning the game," Ken Westerfield brought this unique competitive spirit to all of his disc sports, including ultimate. This spirit wasn't invented by any one person or group but was recognized as just the way these early anti-sports establishment athletes competed. The tradition of this spirit in disc sports has been carried on to this day. Ultimate was the first disc sport to recognize this unique conduct of play and named it the Spirit of the Game (SOTG). In 1978,  it was added to the 7th edition of the rules for ultimate. Beginning in 1975, the Canadian Open Frisbee Championships, held on Toronto Islands, began introducing disc ultimate to Canadians as a showcase event. Westerfield played in these beginning ultimate Frisbee exhibition games with some of the sports founders (Johnny Appleseeds) from Columbia High School (CHS), Maplewood, New Jersey, who were also there to compete in the other events at the Canadian Open competition.
 Westerfield continued to play ultimate through the 1970s, mostly while competing at U.S. over-all NAS tournaments and also played on Santa Cruz's first ultimate team called Good Times (a Santa Cruz weekly newspaper) in the first two years of the Northern California Ultimate Frisbee League (NCUFL), 1977-1979.

In 1979, at age 32, retiring from competing in U.S. and Canadian national freestyle, disc golf and over-all competitions, Westerfield continued to organize and produce local disc events in Toronto, Ontario. In 1979, because of his love of ultimate, began organizing ultimate events and with the help of Irwin Toy's Bob Blakely and Chris Lowcock, created the Toronto Ultimate League. Westerfield started weekly ultimate pick-up games on Kew Beach, then sent team invitations to Wards Island, West Toronto, North Toronto and his own team Beaches. These were the first four teams with each team taking turns hosting Wednesdays weekly league game nights at their home locations. The league starting night was at Kew Beach. Westerfield, using Bob Blakely's office copy machine and mailing facility at Irwin Toy, would produce a weekly newsletter highlighting the games and scores for each team as well as their league standings through the playing season. The Toronto Ultimate League developed and was renamed the Toronto Ultimate Club (TUC), that now has 3300 active members and over 250 teams playing the year round. This was the first ultimate league in Canada and now one of the world's oldest.

In 1987, at the Canadian Ultimate Championships (CUC), Ottawa, Westerfield, with his team Darkside, won Canada's first national ultimate championships. In the 1980s, in the beginning of Toronto's competitive ultimate years, Westerfield's contributions to his teams were his expert handling skills as well as the strength of his sidearm (forehand) huck, hammer and pulls (the starting throw that begins the play, similar to a kickoff in football). Consistently pulling (throwing) deep into the opposing team's end-zone, would always give his team the advantage of having plenty of time to get set-up on defense.

In 2013, as a founding partner, the Toronto Ultimate Club presented Canada's first 
semi-professional ultimate team, the Toronto Rush, to the American Ultimate Disc League (AUDL). They went undefeated 18-0 for the season and won the AUDL Championships.

In 2010, Ken Westerfield was inducted into the inaugural class of the Toronto Ultimate Club Hall of Fame. In 2011, Westerfield was also inducted into the inaugural class of the  Ultimate Canada Hall of Fame.

Toronto Ultimate Club Hall of Fame presentation:

In the 1970s, Ken discovered the game of Ultimate in the USA and brought it to Toronto, Ontario. He introduced the game at Kew Beach to an initial core of people and from there planted the seed for Ultimate Frisbee in Toronto. Ken was larger than life to this growing core of players who craved increased knowledge and skill development. He created pickup and the establishment of (4 teams) beginning in 1980. Not only was he an architect for the origins of the Toronto Ultimate Club, but Ken's influence as a player and a person made his reputation legendary. Simply put, he was the point man on all aspects of disc play, the "go to" guy that everyone looked up to.

Post-Frisbee and disc sports legacy
As with many discoveries, disc sports seems to have been created in part due to an unintended consequence. What began as Westerfield's and others rebellion against social norms and a rejection of what was considered the sports establishment, eventually working in cooperation within unlikely partnerships with "establishment" Frisbee manufacturers sales motivations, as a result, has become one of today's newest and fastest growing sports. Many new and innovative ideas begin as an accidental discovery, but when you consider Westerfield's participation in the beginning of the Frisbee and disc sport development years that followed what was little more than a daily display of his counterculture activity and lifestyle, it would be hard not to see his contributions and influence in today's disc sports. Ken Westerfield is recognized not only for his athletic achievements and being one of the best players of all time, as stated in his hall of fame inductions, but also his influence and contributions as a founder, pioneer, innovator and organizer in the introduction and development of all the disc sports. From numerous shows and demonstrations, as one of the first professional touring Frisbee players, to introducing some of the first Frisbee disc sport competitions and organizations in Canada and the U.S. that are still active today. Freestyle and freestyle competitions are played in countries around the world, with organizing efforts of the FPA. Canada and the US now has over 1.48 million ultimate players that play regularly, with competitions sanctioned by Ultimate Canada and USA Ultimate, including a semi-professional ultimate tour, called the AUDL. Disc golf is played on over 7000 courses in about 40 countries with 500,000 regular players, including a semi-professional tour, set-up by the PDGA. What began as Ken Westerfield's "sixties" daily counterculture pastime, became his storied legacy in disc sports, as well as ironically becoming an "establishment" sport, using the flying disc

After retiring from playing and promoting disc sports in 1988, Westerfield went on to start a number of successful business ventures, K-West Products, importing exotic plants from South America, (1988-1992). Opening a popular biker themed rock and roll bar in downtown Toronto called the Rats Ass Saloon, (1990-1993). A motorcycle shop in West Toronto called Rockerbox Motorcycle Maintenance and Restoration, (1994-1997). In the 1990s, although never wearing a motorcycle club patch himself, Westerfield associated with Bikers and occasionally rode with local club members that were considered to be the 1% of patch-wearing motorcycle clubs in Toronto. Today Westerfield, mostly retired, spends his time in a small town near the U.S. Mexican border called Bisbee, Arizona. He has always had a passion for helping animals and volunteers much of his time working with several animal rescue organizations.

Awards, achievements and event timeline 
 1960 - Westerfield and Kenner, at age thirteen, become friends.
 1963–1965 - Westerfield and Kenner begin their free-form style of Frisbee play summer days at Silver lake and Cass Lake beaches through their high school years in Michigan.
 1965–1969 - Played Frisbee freestyle to crowds, while at various outdoor rock concerts and music festivals including Woodstock.
 1970 - Westerfield and Kenner move from Michigan to Toronto, Ontario, Canada. Play Frisbee freestyle and disc golf daily, in Queen's Park. This was one of the earliest designed object disc golf courses, along with Rochester, NY and Berkeley, CA. also designed in 1970.
 1971 - Hitchhiking across Canada, performed unsponsored improv Frisbee street shows with Kenner in cities along the way, including a summer of Frisbee shows in the historic area of Gastown, in Vancouver, British Columbia.
 1971 - Involved in the Vancouver Gastown Riots while doing Frisbee shows that same night  in the streets of  Gastown.
 1971–1974 - Living in the highly publicized notorious counter-cultural Rochdale College they performed nightly Frisbee shows on the Yonge Street Mall in Toronto, Ontario.
 1972–1976 - As the Canadian Frisbee Champions, Westerfield and Kenner, contracted by Irwin Toy, the Frisbee manufacturer in Canada, to perform Frisbee shows and promote the Jr Frisbee Program at special events across Canada.
 1972–1985 - The Canadian Open Frisbee Championships, Toronto (co-produced and was tournament director with Jim Kenner). Beginning as a guts and distance tournament, later adding freestyle, disc golf, ultimate and over-all individual field events. The Canadian Open and the Vancouver Open were the introduction of disc sports (up until then, the Frisbee was always considered a toy).
 1973 - Planned to introduce the first freestyle competition event at the 2nd annual Canadian Open Frisbee Championships in Toronto, but due to a lack of competitors, canceled the event. Wham-O in the U.S. sent Victor Malafronte and Jo Cahow to see this new freestyle event. It was the first time Westerfield and Kenner would see other highly skilled freestylers.
 1974 - Westerfield and Kenner introduce and win the first freestyle competition at the Canadian Open Frisbee Championships, Toronto, Ontario, Canada.

 1974 - The Decade Awards 1970-1975, Awarded "Best Freestyle Routine", The 1974 Canadian Open, Ken Westerfield/Jim Kenner.
 1974–1979 - Clothing sponsored by Adidas Canada
 1974–1977 - Molson Frisbee Team, performing Frisbee freestyle shows with Jim Kenner at special events and Canadian universities in Ontario.
 1974–1977 - Westerfield and Kenner produced Western Canada's first Frisbee (disc sports) competitions. The Vancouver Open Frisbee Championships at Kitsilano Beach and a Wham-O/Irwin sponsored North American Series (NAS) Tournament in Stanley Park, Vancouver, British Columbia, Canada.
 1975 - World MTA Record 15 seconds, Canadian Open Frisbee Championships, Toronto, Ontario, Canada.
 1975 - Voted Best Men's Player, Ken Westerfield, The Decade Awards 1970-1975.
 1975 - The Canadian Open Frisbee Championships introduces disc ultimate as a showcase event. Westerfield played in these beginning exhibitions along with some of the sports founders (Johnny Appleseeds) from Columbia High School (CHS), Maplewood, New Jersey.

 1975 - Introduced a new freestyle move called a "body-roll" (rolling the disc across outstretched arms and chest or back), at the American Flying Disc Open (AFDO), in Rochester, New York.
 1975–1978 - Signature endorsing the Canadian World Class Frisbee.
 1976 - Presents the first disc golf tournaments in Canada, first as an object course, then using disc pole holes with chains and baskets. Canadian Open Frisbee Championships on Toronto Islands and the Vancouver Open Frisbee Championships, Vancouver, BC ( 1977, Wham-O, NAS event in Stanley Park using natural objects).
 1976 - Vancouver BC, appearing on the Peter Gzowski television show along with Greenpeace activist/founder David McTaggart. The next day was invited by Mctaggart to do a Frisbee show at a Greenpeace rally/protest on Kitsilano Beach in Vancouver.
 1976–1978 - Winning 15 first place titles in only 10 North American Series (NAS) National Frisbee Championships in disc golf, distance and individual over-all events, including 6 U.S. national freestyle titles.
 1977 - Westerfield goes to Santa Cruz, CA and helps Tom Schot organize Frisbee events in Northern California. Kenner and Gail McColl move to London, Ontario to start a disc manufacturing company called Discraft that is today's largest disc sport company that supplies flying disc and accessories for every disc sport.
 1977–1979 - Westerfield played disc ultimate through the 1970s mostly while competing in U.S. over-all North American Series (NAS) tournaments and played on the Santa Cruz Good Times Ultimate Team (sponsored by the Good Times newspaper), in the first two years in the Northern California Ultimate Frisbee League.
 1977 - Design and manufactured a flying disc with Tom Schot. Disc is introduced at the 1978 Santa Cruz Flying Disc Classic. Disc is later retooled and manufactured by Brand-X.
 1977–1978 - Orange Crush Frisbee Team, touring Canada doing Frisbee shows with Mary Kathron, Women's Freestyle Champion.
 1978–1979 - Air Canada Frisbee Team, doing Frisbee shows across Canada with Mary Kathron.

 1978 - At a North American Series (NAS) tournament in Dallas, Texas, became a member of the exclusive "400 Club" with a prelim sidearm throw, and won the event with a throw of 378 feet. Only two competitors had ever thrown a 119-gram Frisbee over 400 feet in competition.
 1978 - In Boulder, Colorado, during a distance demonstration at an (NAS) Frisbee tournament, Ken threw a forehand (sidearm) 119-gram Frisbee 552 feet. This distance record is still the longest distance toss for a Wham-O Frisbee disc. 
 1978 - Santa Cruz Flying Disc Classic, Santa Cruz, California (co-produced and was tournament director with Tom Schot).
 1978–1982 - Good Times Professional Frisbee Show, performing shows with Women's Freestyle Champion Mary Kathron at universities, sporting events and music festivals across Canada and the U.S.
 1979 - Featured in a Wham-O film, "The 1979 World Frisbee Golf Championship" WFC Disc Golf final round. Not shown in the film, the championship ended in a sudden death play-off between Westerfield and Snapper Pierson.
 1979–1980 - Lee Jeans Frisbee Team, freestyle shows in shopping malls and at special events with Mary Kathron.
 1979 - Started the Toronto Ultimate League (Club). This was the first disc ultimate league in Canada and one of the world's oldest leagues. Canada is considered a powerhouse in world disc ultimate and has been ranked number one several times in the world ultimate rankings according to the World Flying Disc Federation.
 1979 - Retires from competing in U.S. and Canadian national (NAS) freestyle and over-all competitions. Continued to organize local disc events in Toronto, as well as playing league and touring team ultimate, Toronto's Zero Tolerance and Darkside (1987 CUC National Champions).
 1983–1985 - Labatt's Schooner Frisbee Team, performing freestyle shows at special events in Canada with Brian McElwain, Patrick Chartrand and Peter Turcaj.
 1985 - World Labatt's Guts Championships, Toronto, Ontario, Canada (co-produced and was tournament director with Peter Turcaj).
 1987 - World Disc Golf Championships (PDGA), Toronto, Ontario, Canada (produced and was tournament director). This is the only time this annual championship has been played outside of the U.S.
 1987 - National Champion on Toronto team Darkside. Canadian Ultimate Championships (CUC), Ottawa, Ontario, Canada.
 1988 - At age 40, retires from playing ultimate and organizing disc sport tournaments. As Recently as 2010 has returned to collaborate on historical and performance disc sports articles and occasionally has shown up as a spectator at various disc events.
 2010 - Inducted into the Inaugural Class of the Toronto Ultimate Club Hall of Fame.
 2011 - Inducted into the Inaugural Class of the Ultimate Canada Hall of Fame.
 2012 - Featured in a flying disc film documentary called The Invisible String, made by a Berlin film group in Germany.
 2013 - Inducted into the PDGA Disc Golf Hall of Fame.
 2013 - 34 years after playing the first league games on Kew Beach (1979), the Toronto Ultimate Club, as a founding partner, presented Canada's first semi-professional ultimate team, the Toronto Rush, to the American Ultimate Disc League.
 2014 - Beaches Team - Special Merit - inducted into the Toronto Ultimate Club Hall of Fame (Kens first team in Toronto ultimate 1979).
 2016 - Inducted into the Inaugural Pioneer Class of the FPA Freestyle Disc Hall of Fame.

See also
 Disc golf
 Flying disc freestyle
 Ultimate (sport)

External links
 Ultimate Canada
 Ultimate Canada Magazine
 The Decade Awards 1970-75
 Toronto Ultimate Club
 Discraft
 Evolution of Disc Golf Discs
 Rush Ultimate in Canada
 Wham-O Frisbee Disc
 Early History of Frisbee and Disc Sports

Newspaper articles

 Sarasota Herald-Tribune - May 21, 1978
 Florence Times Daily June 6, 1976
 The Leader-Post - Jul 14, 1976
 The Calgary Herald - Aug 11, 1979
 The Leader-Post - Aug 4, 1979

Books about Frisbee and disc sports
 Danna, Mark, and Poynter, Dan; Frisbee Players' Handbook, Parachuting Publications, Santa Barbara, California (1978); 
 Horowitz, Judy, and Bloom, Billy; Frisbee: More Than A Game of Catch, Leisure Press, Champaign, Illinois (1984); 
 Leonardo, Tony and Zagoria, Adam co-authored "Ultimate:  The First Four Decades,"  publ. by Ultimate History, Inc., 2005, 
 Morrison, Fred & Kennedy, Phil; Flat Flip Flies Straight! True Origins of the Frisbee, Wormhole Publishers, Wethersfield, CT (January 2006); 
 Norton, Gary; The Official Frisbee Handbook, Bantam Books, Toronto/New York/London (July 1972); no ISBN
 Palmeri, Jim & Kennedy, Phil; A Chain of Events, The Origin & Evolution of Disc Golf Paperback, Unabridged (2015); 
 Stancil, E. D., and Johnson, M. D.; Frisbee, A Practitioner's Manual and Definitive Treatise, Workman Publishing Company, New York (July 1975); 
 Tips, Charles; Frisbee by the Masters, Celestial Arts, Millbrae, California (March 1977); 
 Tips, Charles, and Roddick, Dan; Frisbee Sports & Games, Celestial Arts, Millbrae, California (March 1979);

Notes and references

1947 births
Living people
American disc golfers
American sportsmen
Flying disc
Sportspeople from Detroit
Sportspeople from Livonia, Michigan
Sportspeople from Santa Cruz, California
Ultimate (sport) players
American expatriate sportspeople in Canada